Riivo is an Estonian-language male given name.

People named Riivo include:
 Rait-Riivo Laane (born 1993), Estonian basketball player
 Riivo Sinijärv (born 1947), Estonian chemist, politician and diplomat
 Riivo Valge (born 1975), Estonian military personnel

References

Estonian masculine given names
Given names